Samherji hf. is a fishing and fish processing company in Iceland. It is the largest fishing company in Iceland, and one of the largest in Europe. It was founded in Grindavík in 1972. Its current headquarters are in Akureyri, but the company operates in many locations in Iceland and throughout the world. The company employs approximately 800 staff in Iceland, and 800 staff abroad. One of its companies is the sales company Seagold Ltd. in England, led by Gústaf Baldvinsson.

In 1983, Þorsteinn Már Baldvínsson and his relatives Kristján Vilhelmsson and Þorsteinn Vilhelmsson bought nearly all the stocks in Samherji, and have controlled the company since. 

Þorsteinn Már Baldvinsson is the current CEO, having resumed that role in February of 2021 after having stepped down on 14 November 2019, with Björgólfur Jóhannesson acting as CEO in the interim. 

Samherji owns nearly 16% of the transferable quotas in the Icelandic fisheries sector.

2019 Namibia scandal

On 12 November 2019, WikiLeaks published thousands of documents and email communication by Samherji's employees, called the Fishrot Files, that indicated that the company had paid hundreds of millions ISK to high ranking politicians and officials in Namibia with the objective of acquiring the country's coveted fishing quota. That same day, Jóhannes Stefánsson, the former general manager of Samherji in Namibia and a whistleblower working with anti-corruption authorities in Namibia, and other countries, stated on the investigative TV-program Kveikur on RÚV that Samherji's CEO and biggest shareholder, Þorsteinn Már Baldvinsson, authorized the bribe payments. On 13 November, Namibia's Minister of Fisheries, Bernhardt Esau, and Minister of Justice, Sacky Shanghala, were forced to resign due to their involvement in the scandal.

In response to the allegations, Samherji published a statement where Jóhannes Stefánsson, the former general manager, was accused of being behind the alleged bribes and that other high ranking staff members were unaware of his actions. Although Jóhannes did admit to being part of the bribe sceme, further records showed that he never had control of the bank accounts in Cyprus, where the money flowed through, and that the alleged bribes continued for three years after he left the company.

In May 2021, internal conversations were leaked to the press which showed that since the start of the Namibia scandal, Samherji has employed a special "guerrilla division" with the objective of conducting smear campaigns against the company's critics and journalists who investigated the bribery scheme. In an example of astroturfing, the company had hired a lawyer and public relations manager to pen and edit opinion articles and social media entries which were then published under the name of a ship's captain in Samherji's employ. This unofficial division within the company had monitored the travels and personal finances of some of the company's critics in order to uncover material that might damage their credibility. In an effort to improve news coverage of the company, the division also attempted to influence the leadership election of Iceland's main union of journalists.

The leaked conversations also show that Samherji had planned to dissuade Jóhannes from testifying against the company in Namibian courts by separately suing him for theft in the country.

References

External links 
www.samherji.is Samherji's Official Web Site in English

Food and drink companies established in 1972
1972 establishments in Iceland
Fishing companies
Fish processing companies
Fishing in Iceland
Seafood companies of Iceland